The 1998–99 United Hockey League season was the eighth season of the United Hockey League (Colonial Hockey League before 1997), a North American minor professional league. 11 teams participated in the regular season and the Muskegon Fury won the league title.

Regular season

Colonial Cup-Playoffs

External links
 Season 1998/99 on hockeydb.com

United Hockey League seasons
UHL
UHL